Shurabad (also Romanized as Shūrābād; also known as Shūrābeh) is a village in Dowreh Rural District, Chegeni District, Dowreh County, Lorestan Province, Iran. At the 2006 census, its population was 48, in 12 families.

References 

Towns and villages in Dowreh County